Croton eluteria, known as cascarilla, is a plant species of the genus Croton that is native to the Caribbean. It has been naturalized in other tropical regions of the Americas. It grows to be a small tree or tall shrub, rarely reaching  in height. The flowers are small, with white petals, and very fragrant, appearing in March and April. The scented bark is fissured, pale yellowish brown, and may be covered in lichen.

Cascarilla bark is also used to flavor the liqueurs Campari and Vermouth.

Chemical constituents 

Cascarilla bark contains anything between 1% and 3% volatile oils, a unique series of diterpenoid compounds called cascarillins, lignins, tannin, and resins.  There is also a long list of flavory terpene and diterpene compounds, including pinene, vanillin, D-limonene, and thujene.

Uses
Croton eluteria is used as a fumigant and bitter stomachic.

References

External links 

 

eluteria
Plants described in 1788
Flora of the Bahamas
Flora of Cuba
Flora of the Dominican Republic
Flora of Haiti
Flora of Jamaica
Flora without expected TNC conservation status